The ARC Training Centre for Automated Manufacture of Advanced Composites (AMAC) established under the Industrial Transformation Research Program (ITRP) began its operations on 29 May 2017. With University of New South Wales as the administering node, AMAC operates across two other university nodes (Australian National University and Technical University of Munich) located both locally and internationally. AMAC has nine industry partners on board to support the Centre's aim to lower barriers for Australian industry to access, engage, adopt and propagate automated composite manufacturing innovations. The partnering industries include Australian Nuclear Science and Technology Organisation (ANSTO), Australian Institute of Sports, Advanced Composite Structures Australia, the Defence Science and Technology Group (DST-G), Omni Tankers, Carbonix, AFPT, FEI, and Ford Motor Company.
AMAC had its official opening on 27 November 2017 at UNSW Sydney

References

External links

Research institutes in Australia